Anthony Bassano was a 16th-century Italian musician.

Bassano, born in Bassano del Grappa, Italy, was one of six sons of Jeronimo Bassano (Anthony, Jacomo, Alvise, Jasper, John and Baptista) who moved from Venice to England to the household of Henry VIII to serve the court, probably in 1540. Of his ten children, the five sons (Mark Anthony, Arthur, Edward, Andrea and Jeronimo) all served as musicians to the court of Henry VIII, and a daughter (Lucreece Bassano) married Nicholas Lanier the Elder, grandfather of the artist-musician Nicholas Lanier.

The historian A.L. Rowse in his correspondence to The Times in 1973 claimed that the Bassanos were Jewish and Dr. David Lasocki of Indiana University claimed in his 1995 book that the family were converted Jews. However, Giulio M. Ongaro in his "New Documents on the Bassano Family" in Early Music and Alessio Ruffatti (who did research in the archives of Bassano del Grappa assisted by Professor Pier Cesare Ioly Zorattini both argued that the Bassanos who moved to England were not of Jewish origin .

Besides being wind players in the King's band, the Bassanos were also instrument makers.

Anthony was recorded as a foreigner, formerly Queen Elizabeth's musician, resident in the London parish of St Olave and All Hallows Staining, in 1607. He was married with five children, all born in England.

See also
Lanier family tree

References

The Bassanos, Venetian Musicians and Instrument Makers in England, 1531–1665, by David Lasocki and Roger Prior, published by Scholar Press

Italian emigrants to the Kingdom of England
Italian musicians
16th-century births
16th-century deaths
Woodwind musicians